Sphaerocoryne is a genus of flowering plants belonging to the family Annonaceae.

Its native range is Nigeria to Kenya and Southern Tropical Africa, Indo-China to Western and Central Malesia.

Species
Species:

Sphaerocoryne affinis 
Sphaerocoryne astiae 
Sphaerocoryne blanfordiana 
Sphaerocoryne diospyrifolia 
Sphaerocoryne gracilipes 
Sphaerocoryne gracilis 
Sphaerocoryne touranensis

References

Annonaceae
Annonaceae genera